Steve and Eydie is the name of an American pop vocal duet, consisting of Steve Lawrence and Eydie Gormé. They originally began working together on Tonight Starring Steve Allen in 1954 and performed together until Gormé retired in 2009. Both have also had separate careers as solo singers. The performer name on their duet releases was denoted as "Steve and Eydie," without the last names.  Steve's birth name was Sidney Leibowitz; Edith "Eydie" Gormé was from a multilingual Sephardic Jewish family whose surname was variously spelled Gorman and Gormezano. The two were married from 1957 until Gormé's death in 2013.

They recorded on various labels including Coral and ABC-Paramount in the 1950s, United Artists, Columbia, and  RCA in the 1960s, MGM in the 1970s, and others on to the present. Their last US chart record "Hallelujah", was shown as Parker and Penny.
                             
Their 1960 song "We Got Us" was not released as a hit single but was the title tune on an ABC-Paramount LP album. The album earned them a Grammy Award that year.

In November 2009, Lawrence embarked on a musical tour without Gormé, who stayed home for health reasons. The Steve and Eydie official website confirmed in late 2010 that Gormé had officially retired from touring, for health reasons, and Lawrence would be touring alone from then on.

Eydie Gormé died on August 10, 2013, six days shy of her 85th birthday. Lawrence continued to tour until being diagnosed with Alzheimer's disease in 2019.

Singles

References

External links
 http://www.steveandeydie.com/

American musical duos
Musical groups established in 1957
ABC Records artists
Columbia Records artists
Coral Records artists
MGM Records artists
RCA Victor artists
United Artists Records artists